Wu Jau-nan (14 January 1926 – 14 October 2018) was a Chinese xiangsheng comedian based in Taiwan. He was officially recognized by the government of Taiwan as a "national treasure". He was the recipient of the Lifetime Achievement Award from the Lincoln Center and the Golden Melody Award for Lifetime Contributions. Before becoming a comedian, he ran a food stall in Taipei where he created and popularized the dish Mongolian barbecue.

Creation of Mongolian barbecue 

Wu was born in Beijing, Republic of China, on 14 January 1926.

He originally wanted to call the dish "Beijing barbecue", but because of political sensitivity with the city, which had just recently been designated as the capital of Communist China, he settled with "Mongolian barbecue" instead, even though it had no direct connection with Mongolia.

Wu's food stall became very popular, and even attracted foreign diplomats and wealthy businesspeople as customers despite being a cheap eatery. However, it was later destroyed by flooding during a typhoon, in which Wu nearly drowned. When he exited the restaurant business to develop his xiangsheng career, numerous imitators emerged to capitalize on the popularity of the dish he created, which was later also introduced to the West.

Xiangsheng career 
Wu began performing xiangsheng in 1951 and later exited the restaurant business as his popularity grew. Performing on radio and on stage, he became one of the most famous xiangsheng actors in Taiwan.

Wu moved to the United States in 1973, where he continued to perform xiangsheng as well as Peking opera. He also developed a brand of beef jerky. In 1983, the xiangsheng master Hou Baolin took him as a disciple, inducting him into the formal lineage of the art. Wu trained many students of his own, notably , Lang Tzu-yun, and Fan Kuang-yao. Lang Tzu-yun founded the performing arts troupe Spring Sun, for which Wu has written. 

Wu received many awards including the Lifetime Artistic Achievement Award from the Lincoln Center for the Performing Arts in New York City, the Xinchuan Award of Taiwan and the Outstanding Artist of Asia Award. In 2009, Wu was given the Golden Melody Award for lifetime contributions, which was followed by an honor bestowed at the first Taipei City Master of Traditional Arts Awards ceremony in 2010. The government of Taiwan formally named him a "living national treasure" in 2011.

Personal life 
He was married until his wife's death in 2009. They had one son, Wu Manyu. 

On 14 October 2018, Wu Zhaonan died from multiple organ failure in Los Angeles, California, aged 92. A memorial service was held at the Chiang Kai-shek Memorial Hall in Taipei on 2 November, which was attended by many dignitaries including Ma Ying-jeou, Hung Hsiu-chu and Jason Hu, as well as Wu's disciples including Lang Tzu-yun and Liu Erjin.

References 

1926 births
2018 deaths
Taiwanese xiangsheng performers
Taiwanese male comedians
Taiwanese people from Beijing
Male actors from Beijing
20th-century Taiwanese male actors
Taiwanese emigrants to the United States
Taiwanese restaurateurs
Deaths from multiple organ failure
Chinese xiangsheng performers
Chinese male comedians
20th-century Chinese male actors